San Carlos is a corregimiento in David District, Chiriquí Province, Panama. Its population as of 1990 was 2,543; its population as of 2000 was 3,181.

References

Corregimientos of Chiriquí Province